D32 or D-32 may refer to:

Ships 
 , a Pará-class destroyer of the Brazilian Navy
 General Austria, an Almirante Clemente-class destroyer of the Venezuelan Navy
 , a Battle-class destroyer of the Royal Navy
 , an Attacker-class escort carrier of the Royal Navy
 , a Type 45 destroyer of the Royal Navy
 , a V-class destroyer of the Royal Navy

Other uses 
 D-32 (Michigan county highway)
 D32 road (Croatia)
 Arms-in-embrace (hieroglyph)
 LNER Class D32, a class of British steam locomotives
 Tarrasch Defense, a chess opening